Consumer's risk or Consumer risk is a potential risk found in all consumer-oriented products, that a product not meeting quality standards will pass undetected through the manufacturer's quality control system and enter the consumer marketplace.

See also
Commercial law
Consumer protection laws
Products liability
Uniform Commercial Code
Warranty
Statistics

References

Risk